Hydrocera is a genus of flowering plants in the family Balsaminaceae (balsams). It contains a single species, Hydrocera triflora, from Southeast Asia.  It is the only other genus in the family Balsaminaceae besides Impatiens.

References

Balsaminaceae
Monotypic Ericales genera